Pasquale Amati (1716–1796) was an Italian antiquary, born at Savignano di Romagna (now Savignano sul Rubicone - province of Forlì), and educated at Cesena, Rimini, and Rome. On his return to Savignano he wrote two Dissertazione (Faenza, 1761–63) to prove that the Rubicon was the Savignano river. He also published a Dissertazione sul castro Mutilo degli Antichi Galli e sul Passagio d'Annibale per l'Appennino, at Bologna in 1776.

Appointed to inspect the press at Pesaro, he published a collection of classics, his Biblioteca di Storia Letteraria, 6 vols, 8vo, 1768. However, his best known dissertation is that De Restitutione Purpurarum, in which he investigates the purple dye of the ancients very profoundly. In 1786, he became professor of the Pandects at Ferrara, a position which he retained till his death. He left two sons, both of literary reputation.

Children 
Girolamo Amati (1768–1834), his son
Basilio Amati (1780–1830), his son

References

1716 births
1796 deaths
People from Savignano sul Rubicone
Italian antiquarians
Italian classical scholars
Historians of ancient Rome
18th-century antiquarians